Okuhara (written: 奥原) is a Japanese surname. Notable people with the surname include:

, Japanese badminton player
, Japanese painter
, Japanese footballer

Japanese-language surnames